Ryugyong Chung Ju-yung Gymnasium is an indoor sporting arena located in Pyongyang, North Korea.  The capacity of the arena is 12,309 and was built in 2003. It is used to host indoor sporting events, such as basketball and volleyball as well as concerts and art performances.

See also
Chung Ju-yung

References 

2003 establishments in North Korea
Indoor arenas in North Korea
Sports venues in Pyongyang
Sports venues completed in 2003
Basketball venues in North Korea
Volleyball venues in North Korea